Murder is the Pay-Off is a murder mystery novel written by Leslie Ford. It was published in hardcover by Charles Scribner's Sons in 1951. That same year, it was published in England by Collins Crime Club.

External links 
Murder is the Pay-Off at Fantastic Fiction
Murder is the Pay-Off at Goodreads

1951 American novels
American mystery novels
Collins Crime Club books
Charles Scribner's Sons books